Chafford Hundred is an area in the Borough of Thurrock in the ceremonial county of Essex, England. Chafford Hundred is north-west of Grays.

Its railway station serves the area and Lakeside Shopping Centre.

Lakeside Shopping Centre is in West Thurrock and is located in the Chafford and North Stifford, and South Chafford wards in the borough of Thurrock. Chafford Hundred was built on parts of the historical parishes of Stifford and West Thurrock, Mill Lane being the border of the respective historical parishes.

History
Built on an area of 600 acres, northwest of Grays town centre. Two-thirds of the site was previously used as a chalk quarry, the rest was agricultural land.
Approximately 5,600 houses and flats have been built since 1989 on 353 acres of brownfield housing land. These areas have a variety of housing types which includes private sector housing as well as housing associations and retirement homes.
Chafford Hundred railway station serves the local area, and was built expressly for the settlement. It opened in 1993, and currently sees a twice hourly service connecting it to London, Grays and Southend. The name is re-used from the historic Hundred of Chafford, which covered a much larger area including parts of present-day Thurrock in Essex and the London Borough of Havering in Greater London. Historically, Chafford Hundred was a development within Grays, with the chalk quarry it was built over being a part of the town. However, it is now considered as its own settlement outside of the town's boundaries.

The area has seen large growth since its inception, with many City workers living there due to the relatively easy commute into central London. In 2012, it was reported in the national press, that more than half the flats (in the estate) were repossessed during the early 1990s housing slump, impacting it so significantly that prices fell by half. Housing ranges from one or two bedroom apartments up to five / six bedroom large houses and therefore the area caters for many, although property prices grew rapidly during the late 1990s – The Evening Standard article, "the most coveted address in Britain" by Nick Curtis in 2001 included properties in the new village. This is not due to the architecture of the houses (mostly all very similar starter homes), but because it provides relatively affordable housing with public and recreation areas, as well as generally large private gardens, well connected to many jobs.

There are four elected councillors representing Chafford Hundred, currently Cllr Mark Coxshall and Cllr Garry Hague for Chafford and North Stifford Ward, and Cllr Abbie Akinbohun and Cllr Suzanne Hooper for South Chafford Ward. The area's Member of Parliament is Jackie Doyle Price. Although there were initially no facilities, they managed to raise funds to build a youth park which was launched last year.  
In terms of other facilities, it has one GP surgery, a Church, a gym and 2 main pubs

Schools 
Chafford Hundred currently has four primary schools and one secondary school.

 Tudor Court Primary School
 Warren Primary School
 Harris Primary Academy Chafford Hundred
 Harris Primary Academy Mayflower
 Harris Academy Chafford Hundred (secondary, formerly Chafford Hundred Campus Business and Enterprise College)

Geography
The land is on very gentle slopes (ranging from 18 to 34m AOD) and the area also has included a number of park and recreational areas. The largest area is of special environmental and scientific interest, Chafford Gorges Nature Park; its management was taken over by Essex Wildlife Trust on 9 June 2005.

References

Thurrock
Populated places in Essex